Hösbach station is a railway station in the municipality of Hösbach, located in the Aschaffenburg district in Bavaria, Germany.

References

Railway stations in Bavaria
Buildings and structures in Aschaffenburg (district)